Monastery of St. Job of Pochaev in Ladomirová was an Eastern Orthodox monastery that operated from 1923 to 1946 in the village of Ladomirová (now Svidník District, Slovakia). The monastery was formally under the jurisdiction of the Mukachevo-Prešov diocese of the Serbian Orthodox Church, but in fact the leadership was carried out by Vitaly (Maksimenko) of Russian Orthodox Church Outside of Russia. Many famous clergy and monks of the ROCOR lived in the monastery. The monastery, which had its own printing house, was known for its energetic and large-scale activities in publishing and distributing religious literature. The Brotherhood played an important role in spreading Orthodoxy in Slovakia.

On August 1, 1944, almost all the monks headed by its abbot Seraphim (Ivanov) left the monastery, fleeing from the advancing Red Army. Only three inhabitants remained in the monastery, headed by Sabbas (Struve). On November 15, 1944, units of the Red Army entered Ladomirová. The territory of the monastery was severely damaged by the air raid. Of the monastery buildings, only the in the Archangel Michael church has been preserved. The monastic community at the Archangel Michael church de jure ceased to exist in 1946. Although the Orthodox Church of the Czech Lands and Slovakia planned to reestablish the monastery, such a thing was never carried out. Nevertheless, Ladomirová still remains a place of Eastern Orthodox pilgrimage.

Literature 
 Лавр (Шкурла), архиеп. Воспоминания о переезде монашеской братии из Ладомировой в Джорданвилль в 1944-46 гг. // Православная Русь. — 1997. — № 7. — С. 6-8;
 
 
 
 
 
 Евфимий (Логвинов), иером. О почаевской традиции в Русском Зарубежье // Материалы ежегодной богословской конференции. 2007. — Т. 1. — С. 290—296.
 
 Колупаев В. Е.. Православная книга Русского Зарубежья первой половины XX века: Из истории типографского братства Иова Почаевского, Волынь — Карпаты, 1903—1944. Монография. — М.: Издательство «Пашков дом», 2010. — 272 с. — ISBN 978-5-7510-0432-3
 Псарёв А. В. диак., В. В. Бурега Братства Преподобного Иова Почаевского и их роль в истории Русской Православной Церкви Заграницей // Труди Київської Духовної Академії. 2012. — № 16. — С. 278—293
 
 
 
 
 
 

Monasteries of the Russian Orthodox Church Outside of Russia
Christian monasteries in Slovakia
1923 establishments in Slovakia